Antaeotricha cyprodeta is a moth in the family Depressariidae. It was described by Edward Meyrick in 1930. It is found in Brazil (Rio Grande so Sul).

The wingspan is 15–17 mm. The forewings are white with some irregular light grey suffusion or marbling in the cell, in females more extensive and reaching the costa. There are two undefined darker greyish spots in the disc anteriorly and a dark grey dot on the lower angle of the cell and fine grey strigula above it. A short light grey transverse shade is found beyond the cell, and another from the costa at three-fourths to the tornus, slightly indented near the costa. Two spots of grey suffusion are found on the posterior half of the dorsum and a coppery terminal fascia is narrowed to the tornus, the anterior portion suffused grey and suffusedly irrorated white, tending to indicate alternate streaks. The hindwings are grey-whitish in males and light grey in females. In males, the costal area is somewhat expanded from the base to three-fourths, with a thin whitish hairpencil lying in a subcostal groove from the base to beyond the middle.

References

Moths described in 1930
cyprodeta
Taxa named by Edward Meyrick
Moths of South America